Bissetia poliella is a moth in the family Crambidae. It was described by George Hampson in 1919. It is found in Ghana, Malawi, Nigeria and Uganda.

References

Haimbachiini
Moths described in 1919